In 2012, Madagascar had an upsurge in the size of its Malagasy migratory locust (Locusta migratoria capito) populations. In November of that year, the government issued a locust alert, saying that conditions were right for swarming of the pest insects. In February 2013, Cyclone Haruna struck the country, creating optimal conditions for locust breeding.  By late March 2013, approximately 50% of the country was infested by swarms of locusts, with each swarm consisting of more than one billion insects. The authorities changed the situation to plague status.  According to one eyewitness,"You don't see anything except locusts. You turn around, there are locusts everywhere". 

News of the infestation went global the week before Passover, inspiring comparisons with the Biblical Plagues of Egypt, one of which was a swarm of locusts. It is the worst locust outbreak in Madagascar since a 17-year-long outbreak which began during the 1950s.

Pest control

On March 26, 2013, the Food and Agriculture Organization (FAO) of the United Nations called for US$41 million of donations to fight the locusts. Under the proposed aid plan, $22 million would be delivered by June for pest control efforts and $19 million would be devoted to a three-year plan to keep the insect in check.  According to the FAO report, the infestation threatens 60% of the country's rice crop, as well as livestock pastures.  Rice is a staple crop in Madagascar, a nation where a large percentage of the population lives in famine conditions. In the southwestern region of Madagascar, where the locusts are the worst, 80% of the population lives in poverty.

The FAO plan calls for large-scale aerial operations to spray extra pesticides over 1.5 million hectares (3.7 million acres) of land from 2013 to 2014.  According to the national Locust Control Centre, 100,000 out of 130,000 hectares (257,000 out of 321,000 acres) of vulnerable crop land had not been treated at the time of the FAO proposal.  If no action is taken, the FAO estimates that two-thirds of Madagascar will be infested by September, and says the infestation could last for five to ten years.  "Failure to respond now will lead to massive food aid requirements later on," said Dominique Burgeon, Director of the FAO Emergency and Rehabilitation Division. Additionally, the infestation threatens the habitat of numerous endangered species, especially several species of lemur.

See also
 List of locust swarms

References

External links
FAO minisite on the locust outbreak
 FAO plan to combat the outbreak
FAO video on the locust outbreak

Locust
Locust
Locust swarms
Natural disasters in Madagascar
2013 disasters in Madagascar